Bigg Boss Non-Stop, is the first season of the Indian Telugu-language reality digital series of Bigg Boss Non-Stop and the first series to be released exclusively on Star India's streaming platform Disney+ Hotstar. The season premiered on 26 February 2022 with Nagarjuna as a host.

The season's finale took place on 21 May 2022 with Bindu Madhavi winning the title along with 40 lakh prize money while Akhil Sarthak emerged as the first runner-up.

Production

Announcement 
On 24 December 2021, In an official press interaction with media, the makers have announced Bigg Boss Telugu OTT will be set to be streamed soon and also said the digital version of the show is going to be different from its television counterpart. On 9 February 2022, Disney+ Hotstar revealed the show's title along with a new logo. The title and logo of 'Bigg Boss Non-Stop' were unveiled.

Teaser 
The logo has a striking blend of blue and red with the Bigg Boss eye and the title in grey grabbing all the attention. The debut OTT version comes with the tagline 'Non-Stop entertainment'. On 15 February 2022, Host Nagarjuna has confirmed the same with a teaser featuring Vennela Kishore and Murali Sharma alongside him.

Format 
As like the televised series, the group of contestants referred to as Housemates are enclosed in the Bigg Boss House under constant surveillance of cameras and microphones.

Theme

vs  
The TV series has invited new contestants from film, TV, Radio, and social media fraternities every season. Bigg Boss Non-Stop will have a line up of both former Bigg Boss Telugu contestants dubbed as  Warriors and celebrities who will make their Bigg Boss debut and are dubbed as Challengers.

The concept of Challengers Vs Warriors was ended on day 14 by Raj Tarun who came for Stand Up Rahul Movie Promotion

Housemate status 

 indicates Season 1 contestant indicates Season 2 contestant indicates Season 3 contestant indicates Season 4 contestant indicates Season 5 contestant indicates new contestants

Housemates

Original entrances

Ashu reddy – Indian movie actress and dubsmasher, she is well known for her work in the Telugu film industry. She made her acting debut with the Telugu movie Chal Mohan Ranga. She was evicted on Day 35 in Bigg Boss (Telugu season 3). 
Mahesh Vitta – Indian actor, who has acted in Telugu films. He is best known for his performance in the internet comedy series Fun Bucket. He was evicted on Day 84 in Bigg Boss (Telugu season 3). 
Mumaith Khan – Indian actress and model. She has appeared in numerous item numbers in Telugu, Hindi, Tamil, Kannada, Bengali, and Odia language films. She was evicted on Day 49 in Bigg Boss (Telugu season 1).
 Ariyana Glory – TV presenter. She worked in well-known channels like Studio Network and Gemini TV. She became as third runner-up in Bigg Boss (Telugu season 4).
 Nataraj – Dance choreographer and television judge. He was part of the reality dance show Aata. He was evicted on Day 28 in Bigg Boss (Telugu season 5).
 Tejaswi Madivada – Indian actress and model. A dance tutor turned actress, she made her acting debut with Seethamma Vaakitlo Sirimalle Chettu and became noted after starring in Ice Cream. She was evicted on Day 42 in Bigg Boss (Telugu season 2).
 Hamida Khatoon – Film actress. She is known for the film Sahasam Cheyara Dimbaka. She was evicted on Day 35 in Bigg Boss (Telugu season 5).
 Sarayu Roy – YouTuber. She is a part of the 7 Arts YouTube channel. She was evicted on Day 7 in Bigg Boss (Telugu season 5).
 Akhil Sarthak – Television actor. He is best known for his role in the Kalyani serial. He is the "Hyderabad Times Most Desirable Man 2020-21" on Television. He became runner-up in Bigg Boss (Telugu season 4).

Ajay Kumar – Film actor and he well known for his films Mehbooba, and Vishwak.
 Sravanthi Chokarapu – Indian Film Actress, Anchor, and Model. She started her career in modeling. She then turned Anchor and worked for in Yoyo TV channel and also worked in the Filmy Focus and Jabardasth show.
 RJ Chaitu – Most popular Radio Jockeys of Hyderabad. He also hosted special events and shows.
 Shree Lapaki– Film Actress, model and costume designer. She made her acting debut with the film Nagnam in the year 2020. She was also a part of the popular dance reality TV show 'Rangasthalam'. She has hosted a few celebrity interviews and events as well.
 Anil Rathod is a Popular Fashion Model and actor. He appeared in many brands and international shows. He also won many awards like Mr. Telangana 2015, Best Model of the Year by TAA, and Best Model – Rubaru Mr. India 2021.
 Shiva – He was an anchor who mainly works in the Telugu Entertainment industry. He has worked in NTV News Channel and also worked in more than 7 Channels like Telugu Full Screen, Telugu Vikas, Daily Culture, News Qube Channel. He started his own YouTube Channel Mana Media.
 Mitraaw Sharma – Producer, Model, and actress, in the Telugu industry. She made her acting debut with Telugu Movie Boys (2021).
 Bindu Madhavi – Indian model and actress, working in Telugu and Tamil industry.  She is known for the films Aavakai Biryani, Pilla Jamindar, Rama Rama Krishna Krishna, Kazhugu (2012 film), Kedi Billa Killadi Ranga. She also participated in Bigg Boss (Tamil season 1) and she emerged as the 4th runner up.

Wildcard entrant (Warrior)
Baba Bhaskar – Dance choreographer, director who works mainly in Tamil and Telugu language films. He also appears in Ishmart Jodi 2, Cook with Comali 2 as a contestant and television Judge in dance reality shows. He became second runner-up in Bigg Boss (Telugu season 3).

Weekly summary

Nomination Table

Notes
  indicates the contestant is Warrior
  indicates the contestant is Challenger
  indicates the Nominees for house captaincy.
  indicates the House Captain.
 indicates the former House Captain. (House Captain would have been stripped off the captaincy i.e., evicted/ejected/walked out after being nominated as the Captain)
  indicates that the Housemate was directly nominated for eviction prior to the regular nominations process.
  indicates that the Housemate was granted immunity from nominations.
  indicates the winner.
  indicates the first runner up.
  indicates the second runner up.
  indicates the third runner up.
  indicates the fourth runner up.
  indicates the fifth runner up.
  indicates the sixth runner up.
  indicates the contestant as Best Performer of the week.
  indicates the contestant as Worst Performer of the week.
  indicates that the housemate went to secret room.
  indicates the contestant has re-entered the house.
  indicates the contestant has walked out of the show.
  indicates the contestant has been evicted.

: All the Challengers had to nominate two Warriors by representing them with a hashtag.
: All the Warriors had to select any two of the challengers to get directly nominated with a majority of decision. As a result, Chaitu and Mitraaw were nominated.
: All the Warriors had to nominate only one Challenger and all Challengers had to nominate two Warriors.
: Chaitu was stripped off the captaincy after he was evicted on Day 21. He choose Anil to take up Captain duties but didn't receive immunity.
: Week 5's nominations were part of a task.
: On day 30, Bigg Boss gave an Immunity Task. In each round  Ashu, Bindu and Mahesh won the task saved themselves from nominations and they were replaced by save housemates' decision. They chose Sravanthi, Tejaswi and Bindu respectively.
: In Week 7's nominations part, Bigg Boss paired-up the housemates and asked them to mutually decide to nominate one and save one.
: While the other housemates nominated Bindu, Bhaskar saved her after the nominations.
: For this week, housemates had to choose three housemates not deserving to be in Top 5. But all housemates were nominated by Bigg Boss.
: On Day 77, Akhil, Anil, Ariyana, Bhaskar, Bindu, Mithraaw and Shiva announced as Top 7 finalists.
: On Day 84, Anil become as 6th runner-up, Bhaskar became as 5th runner-up and Mithraaw become as 4th runner-up.
: On Day 84, Ariyana accepted 10 lakh rupees from prize money then she walked out of the house and become as 3rd runner-up while Shiva became as 2nd runner-up.
: On Day 84, Bindu won the title and Akhil become as 1st runner-up.

Guest Appearance

References

External links 

 Official Website

Bigg Boss (Telugu TV series) seasons
2022 Indian television seasons
Telugu-language Disney+ Hotstar original programming